Use Me is the third studio album by American rock band Pvris. It was released August 28, 2020, by Warner Records. The album features 11 songs, three of which are featured on the band's 2019 EP, Hallucinations. Use Me is the band's final album to feature lead guitarist Alex Babinski, who was fired from the band following allegations of sexual misconduct two days before the album's release.

Background 

On March 4, Pvris announced the album's title and initial May 1 release date. However, due to the ongoing COVID-19 pandemic, the album was postponed to July 10, and once more to August 28.

A deluxe edition of the album was released on October 22, 2020.

Singles 

The singles "Death of Me" and "Hallucinations" were originally released in 2019 for the band's first EP Hallucinations (2019).

On March 4, 2020, the single, "Dead Weight" was released. It is the first single from Use Me released apart from Hallucinations. On April 24, they released the fourth single "Gimme a Minute" along with a sci-fi themed music video.

Critical reception 

Use Me received critical acclaim. On review aggregator website Album of the Year, it has a rating of 84 out of 100 based on 11 reviews.

Track listing
All tracks are produced by JT Daly, except where noted.

Notes 
 Physical versions of the album contain the original version of "Use Me", which did not contain a verse from 070 Shake and instead contained a second verse from Lynn Gunn.
  indicates an additional producer

Personnel
 Lyndsey Gunnulfsen – vocals (all tracks), background vocals (1–9, 15, 16), bass (1–5, 9, 12, 15), drums (1, 2, 4, 5, 9, 11, 15), electric guitar (1–5, 9, 11, 12, 15), percussion (1–5, 9, 11, 15), acoustic guitar (4, 8, 9, 16), programming (9), remixing (16)
 JT Daly – keyboards (1–5, 8–11, 14–16), programming (1–6, 8–11, 14–16), strings (8, 10, 14, 16)
 Tommy English – additional guitar (2, 15)
 Jeremy Larson – strings (10, 14)
 070 Shake – vocals (10, 14)
 Mitch Allan – electric guitar, keyboards, programming, synthesizer (12)
 Mag – keyboards, programming, synthesizer (12)
 Raye – vocals (12)
 Mija – remixing (14)
 Nicole Moudaber – remixing (15)

Technical
 Joe LaPorta – mastering (1–11, 13–16)
 Chris Gehringer (12)
 JT Daly – mixing (1, 10, 13, 14, 16), engineering (1–11, 14–16)
 Mark "Spike" Stent – mixing (2, 6, 7, 15)
 Lars Stolfers – mixing (3–5, 8, 9)
 Michael Freeman – mixing (6), mixing assistance (7)
 Josh Lovell – mixing (11), engineering (1, 4, 7, 8, 11, 15, 16), engineering assistance (2, 3, 5, 6, 9, 10, 13, 14)
 Mag – mixing (12)
 Lyndsey Gunnulfsen – engineering (7)
 Caleb Hulin – engineering (12)
 Bailey McDougal – vocal recording (14)
 Jeremy Larson – engineering assistance (10, 13, 14)
 Drew Gold – additional editing (15)

Charts

References

2020 albums
Albums postponed due to the COVID-19 pandemic
Warner Records albums
Pvris albums